Carnago is a comune (municipality) in the Province of Varese in the Italian region Lombardy, located about  northwest of Milan and about  south of Varese.

The municipality of Carnago contains the frazione (subdivision) Rovate. Carnago is also the location of Milanello, the training facility of Serie A giant A.C. Milan.

Carnago borders the following municipalities: Cairate, Caronno Varesino, Cassano Magnago, Castelseprio, Gornate-Olona, Oggiona con Santo Stefano, Solbiate Arno.

Demographic evolution

References

External links
www.comune.carnago.va.it

Cities and towns in Lombardy